Marie Louise Berneri (born Maria Luisa Berneri; 1 March 1918 – 13 April 1949) was an anarchist activist and author. Born in Italy, she spent much of her life in Spain, France, and England. She was involved with the short-lived publication, Revision, with Luis Mercier Vega and was a member of the group that edited Revolt, War Commentary, and the newspaper Freedom. She was a continuous contributor to Spain and the World. She also wrote a survey of utopias, Journey Through Utopia, first published in 1950 and re-issued in 2020. Neither East Nor West is a selection of her writings (1952).

Early life
She was born in Arezzo, Italy, the elder daughter of Camillo & Giovanna Berneri. The family went into exile in 1926 for resisting Mussolini. In 1936 her father went to Spain, to fight against the fascists in the Spanish Civil War. He was assassinated by communists in 1937. Marie visited Barcelona twice, the second time after her father's murder. Around this time she was living in France and studying psychology at the Sorbonne.

Anarchism
Towards the end of 1937 she married Vernon Richards, also an active anarchist with many of the same groups and publications as she. In April 1945 she was one of the four editors of War Commentary which she had helped to found, who were tried for incitement to disaffection. Because her husband was a co-defendant, she was acquitted on a legal technicality that allows that a wife cannot conspire with her husband. When her three comrades were imprisoned, she took on the main responsibility for maintaining the paper into the postwar period.

She attended the first post-war international anarchist conference in Paris, 1948 as a member of the British delegation. Her mother and sister Giliane Berneri, a medical doctor, also attended as members of the Italian and French delegations. She received much praise for her Freedom Press pamphlet, the anti-Stalinist Workers in Stalin's Russia (1944). Berneri was also one of the first people in Britain to promote the ideas of Wilhelm Reich.

Death and legacy
In December 1948 Berneri gave birth at home but the baby died shortly afterwards. Berneri died on the 13th of April 1949 at the age of 31 from a viral infection. She was cremated at Kensal Green Cemetery and her ashes scattered in a north London park. Her friends formed the Marie Louise Berneri Memorial Committee and in 1949 published the book Marie Louise Berneri, 1918 – 1949: A Tribute. In 1950 the book Journey Through Utopia was published posthumously. In 1952 the memorial committee published Neither East Nor West, a selection of Berneri's articles from War Commentary.

George Woodcock and Ivan Avacumovic dedicated their biography of Peter Kropotkin, The Anarchist Prince (1950), to Marie-Louise Berneri, "a true disciple of Kropotkin."

Works
 Peter Kropotkin: His Federalist Ideas (1922)
 Workers in Stalin's Russia (1945)
 Journey Through Utopia (1950)
 Neither East Nor West: Selected Writings 1939–1948 (1952)

References

Further reading

External links 
See Marie-Louise Berneri, from The Anarchist Encyclopedia at Recollection Books

Marie-Louise Berneri page at Marxists.org
1949 tribute to marie-louise berneri

1918 births
1949 deaths
People from Arezzo
University of Paris alumni
British anarchists
English anarchists
Italian anarchists
Italian emigrants to the United Kingdom
Anarcho-communists
Deaths from infectious disease
Italian expatriates in France
Italian expatriates in Spain